The R552 is a Regional Route in the City of Johannesburg Metropolitan Municipality in Gauteng, South Africa. It connects Lanseria International Airport with Fourways.

Route
Its north-western terminus is a junction with the M5 (Beyers Naudé Drive), connecting with Elandsdrift Road to the R512 (Malibongwe Drive; Pelindaba Road) just south of the Lanseria International Airport entrance. It begins by going south-east as 6th Avenue to fly over the N14 Highway and reach a staggered junction with the R114 (Lion Park Road).

From the R114 junction, it continues south-east as Cedar Road, through the suburb of Dainfern, through the suburbs of Broadacres and Craigavon, to reach its end at a junction with the R564 (Witkoppen Road) in Fourways, Sandton.

References

Regional Routes in Gauteng